Akka! Bagunnava? is a 1996 Indian Telugu-language drama film, written by Sriraj Ginne and directed by Mouli. The film stars Vikram, Jayasudha and Anand in the leading roles, while Ravali and Subhashri play supporting roles.

Cast 

 Vikram as Chandrababu
 Jayasudha
 Anand
 Ravali
 Subhashri
 Devan
 Tanikella Bharani
 Brahmanandam
 M. S. Narayana
 Gautam Raju
 C. V. L. Narasimha Rao
Gundu Hanumantha Rao
 Raghava Lawrence in a special appearance

Production 
The film progressed smoothly and was completed without a climax portion shot. Producer Prasad later approached then budding writer Trivikram Srinivas to help propose a climax, which was later completed by Posani Krishna Murali and used in the film.

Release 
The film was later dubbed and released in Tamil under the title Aarusamy by Supriya Arts, as a result of Vikram's new found saleability after the release of Sethu (1999).

Soundtrack 

The soundtrack album was composed by Koti.

Tracklist

References 

1996 films
Indian drama films
1990s Telugu-language films
Films scored by Koti
1996 drama films
Films directed by T. S. B. K. Moulee